Ancistrus formoso is a species of catfish in the family Loricariidae. It is native to South America, where it occurs only in the cave of Buraco do Ducho in the Formoso phreatic system in Brazil. It is a stygobitic species that is known to lack eyes and body pigmentation, which indicate a high level of specialization to living in a subterranean, lightless environment. It is one of three known stygobitic members of Ancistrus, alongside A. cryptophthalmus and A. galani. The species reaches 7.9 cm (3.1 inches) SL.

References 

formoso
Fish described in 1997
Fauna of Brazil
Cave fish